The East Lake Commons Conservation Community in Atlanta, Georgia is a residential project which is award-winning for its sustainable design.

It was awarded the World Habitat Award by the United Nations in 2001. Designers of the project include architects Charles Durrett and Kathryn McCamant.

References

Neighborhoods in Atlanta